Ammaiyagaram is a village in the Thanjavur district of Tamil Nadu, India. It is situated in the Kaveri delta region. Nearby towns are Thirukattupalli (9 km), Budalur (8 km) and Thanjavur (21 km).

References 

Villages in Thanjavur district